The Inspiration I Feel is an album by flautist Herbie Mann featuring tunes associated with Ray Charles recorded in 1968 and released on the Atlantic label.

Reception

AllMusic awarded the album 2½ stars and its review by Scott Yanow states, "The renditions on this out-of-print LP will not make anyone forget the influential singer, but they are reasonably enjoyable and respectful".

Track listing 
 "Lonely Avenue" (Doc Pomus) - 6:22
 "Drown in My Own Tears" (Henry Glover) - 5:05
 "Sticks and Stones" (Titus Turner) - 5:40
 "I Got a Woman" (Ray Charles, Renald Richard) - 7:53
 "Come Rain or Come Shine" (Harold Arlen, Johnny Mercer) - 4:41
 "Georgia on My Mind" (Hoagy Carmichael, Stuart Gorrell) - 4:47

Personnel 
Herbie Mann - flute with unidentified large band with voices on some tracks featuring:
David Newman - tenor saxophone
Sonny Sharrock - guitar
Miroslav Vitouš - bass
Bruno Carr - drums
William S. Fischer - arranger, conductor
Technical
Adrian Barber - recording engineer
Haig Adishian - album design
Dimitrie Berea - cover portrait of Herbie Mann

References 

Herbie Mann albums
1968 albums
Albums produced by Nesuhi Ertegun
Albums produced by Joel Dorn
Atlantic Records albums
Ray Charles tribute albums